Kajen is a town in Central Java, Indonesia and the administrative centre of the Pekalongan Regency in the province of Central Java. Its population was 58,048 at the 2010 Census and 73,067 at the 2020 Census.

Climate
Kajen has a tropical rainforest climate (Af) with moderate rainfall from June to September and heavy to very heavy rainfall from October to May.

References

Regency seats of Central Java